Phlegmacium balteatialutaceus is a species of fungus in the family Cortinariaceae.

Taxonomy 
This species was originally described in 2014 and classified as Cortinarius balteatialutaceus. It was placed in the subgenus (subgenus Phlegmacium).

In 2022 the species was transferred from Cortinarius and reclassified as Phlegmacium balteatialutaceus based on genomic data.

Habitat and distribution 
This species was found in Fennoscandia, where it grows in association with birch in subalpine birch forests as well as middle and northern boreal forests located close to oceans. Fruiting occurs from mid-August to mid-September.

See also
List of Cortinarius species

References

External links

balteatialutaceus
Fungi described in 2014
Fungi of Europe